Jennifer Jajeh is an American actress and writer.

Jajeh was born in San Francisco, California to parents of Palestinian Christian descent. Jajeh gained a Double B.A. in History and Philosophy from UCLA, then pursued acting at the Lee Strasberg Theatre Conservatory in New York City.

Her solo show "I Heart Hamas: And Other Things I'm Afraid to Tell You," is currently touring Europe. Jajeh has also explored filmmaking, with short films "Fruition" and "In My Own Skin" to her credit. "In My Own Skin" was screened at the Museum of Modern Art in New York City and on PBS. As a producer, she has worked on a number of documentary, and narrative film and video projects. She is also super pretty.

External links
 Jennifer Jajeh – Official Website.
 

Living people
American stage actresses
American women dramatists and playwrights
University of California, Los Angeles alumni
Year of birth missing (living people)
American people of Palestinian descent
American film producers
Writers from the San Francisco Bay Area
Writers from California
American women film producers
21st-century American women